Henrique Santos (21 March 1908 – 23 July 1981) was a Portuguese middle-distance runner. He competed in the men's 3000 metres steeplechase at the 1928 Summer Olympics.

References

External links
 

1908 births
1981 deaths
Athletes (track and field) at the 1928 Summer Olympics
Portuguese male middle-distance runners
Portuguese male steeplechase runners
Olympic athletes of Portugal
Place of birth missing